Nucleotidyltransferases are transferase enzymes of phosphorus-containing groups, e.g., substituents of nucleotidylic acids or simply nucleoside monophosphates. The general reaction of transferring a nucleoside monophosphate moiety from A to B, can be written as:
A-P-N + B  A + B-P-N
For example, in the case of polymerases, A is pyrophosphate and B is the nascent polynucleotide.
They are classified under EC number 2.7.7 and they can be categorised into:
Uridylyltransferases, which transfer uridylyl- groups
Adenylyltransferases, which transfer adenylyl- groups
Guanylyltransferases, which transfer guanylyl- groups
Cytitidylyltransferases, which transfer cytidylyl- groups
Thymidylyltransferases, which transfer thymidylyl- groups

Role in metabolism 
Many metabolic enzymes are modified by nucleotidyltransferases. The attachment of an AMP (adenylylation) or UMP (uridylylation) can activate or inactivate an enzyme or change its specificity (see figure). These modifications can lead to intricate regulatory networks that can finely tune enzymatic activities so that only the needed compounds are made (here: glutamine).

Role in DNA repair mechanisms

Nucleotidyl transferase is a component of the repair pathway for single nucleotide base excision repair.  This repair mechanism begins when a single nucleotide is recognized by DNA glycosylase as incorrectly matched or has been mutated in some way (UV light, chemical mutagen, etc.), and is removed.  Later, a nucleotidyl transferase is used to fill in the gap with the correct base, using the template strand as the reference.

References

External links
 

Transferases